Sergejs Potapkins  (born 1977) is a Latvian politician. He is a member of Harmony and a deputy of the 12th Saeima. In 2016, Potapkins was awarded the Memorial Award of the National Assembly.

References

External links
Saeima website

1977 births
Living people
National Harmony Party politicians
Social Democratic Party "Harmony" politicians
Deputies of the 11th Saeima
Deputies of the 12th Saeima